Hypsopygia cohortalis is a species of snout moth in the genus Hypsopygia. It is found in North America, including Colorado, Arizona, California, New Mexico and Ohio.

References

Moths described in 1878
Pyralini